The 2012 Golden Icons Academy Movie Awards was the maiden edition of the ceremony to reward excellence in African cinema. It was hosted by Jim Iyke.

Awards

African Films Category

 Best Motion Picture
 Unge’s War
 Man on Ground
 Somewhere in Africa
 Mr. and Mrs.
 Two Brides and A Baby
 I'll Take My Chances

 Best Drama Film
 The Groom’s Bride
 In the Cupboard
 Kokomma
 Somewhere in Africa
 Two Brides and A Baby
 Enemy of the Family

 Best Actor
 Majid Michel – Somewhere in Africa Jimmy Jean-Louis – Sinking Sands OC Ukeje – Two Brides and A Baby George Davidson – Dangerous Men Joseph Benjamin (actor) – Mr. and Mrs. Hakeem Kae-Kazim – Man on Ground Best Actress
 Ini Edo – In the Cupboard Jackie Appiah – Deadly Affair Nse Ikpe Etim – Mr. and Mrs. Stella Damasus – Two Brides and a Baby
 Yvonne Okoro – Single 6 Nadia Buari – Hands of Time Best Comedy Act
 Ime Bishop Umoh - Okon Lagos
 Funke Akindele - Wisdom of Thomas Mercy Johnson - Dumebi Monalisa Chinda - Okon Lagos Lilian Bach - Eletan Best New Actor
 Leo’ Uche – Unge’s War Uti Nwachukwu – In the Cupboard
 Bryan Okwara – I'll Take My Chances Bobby Michaels – Facebook Lovers Eddie Watson – Single 6 James Gardener – The Groom’s Bride Best New Actress
 Keira Hewatch – Two Brides and a Baby Nana Akua Amoah – Single 6 Belinda Effah – Kokomma
 Zita Galega – Single 6 Ama K. Abebrese  - Sinking Sands Joy Orie (JJ Bunny) – Trapped in the Game Best Supporting Actor
 Alex Ekubo – In the Cupboard Okey Uzoeshi – Two Brides and a Baby Van Vicker – Hands of Time Frank Artus – Trapped in the Game
 Leo U’Che – Dangerous Men Yemi Blaq – Sinking Sands Best Original Screenplay
 Sinking Sands – Leila Djansi
 Unge’s War -  GuGu Michael
 In the Cupboard – Desmond Elliot My Life, My Damage – Uche Jombo
 Two Brides and a Baby – Blessing Egbe
 Single 6 – Pascal Amanfo

 Best Supporting Actress
 Chelsea Eze – Two Brides and a Baby
 Biola Segun Williams – In the Cupboard Yvonne Nelson – Trapped in the Game Martha Ankomah – Somewhere in Africa Lilian Ini Ikpe – Kokomma Chisom Oz Lee – Timeless Passion Best Indigenous Film (native language)
 Unge's War Eletan Okon Lagos Idomo Kokomma Udeme Mi Best Film Director
 Teco Benson - Two Brides and a Baby Tom Robson - Kokomma Frank Rajah Arase - Somewhere in Africa
 Desmond Elliot - In the Cupboard Van Vicker - Hands of Time Phil Efe Bernard - Deadly Affair Best Film Producer
 GuGu Michaels  – Unge’s War Kwame Boadu – Somewhere in Africa
 Emem Isong – I'll Take My Chances Chinwe Egwuagu – Mr. and Mrs. Abdul Salam Mumuni  - The Groom’s Bride Blessing Egbe -  Two Brides and Baby Best Costume
 I'll Take My Chances The Groom’s Bride Somewhere in Africa Unge’s War Two Brides and A Baby Best Sound
 Deadly Affair Sinking Sands Somewhere in Africa I'll Take My Chances Unge’s War The Groom’s Bride Best CinematographyUnge's WarMan on GroundThe Groom’s BrideSinking SandsTwo Brides and a BabyDeadly Affair GIAMA Humanitarian Award
Omotola Jalade – Omotola Youth Empowerment (OYEP) Foundation
 Nana Ama Mcbrown – Nana Ama and The Mcbrown Family Foundation
 Van Vicker –  Van Vicker Foundation
 Juliet Ibrahim –  The Juliet Ibrahim Kidney Cancer Foundation (JIF)
 John Dumelo – John Dumelo foundation
 Monalisa Chinda – Monalisa Chinda Sunshine Foundation

Diaspora Films Category
 Best Film – Diaspora
 Bianca Secret Past The Entrapped The Mechanic (Who is the Man) Black Money Paparazzi Best Actress – Diaspora
 Sanu Kalu – Scarlet Divine Shaw – Black Money Maureen Esealuka – Bianca
 Amaka Morghalu – Faithfulness Syr Law – The Entrapped Seun Maduka – The Mechanic (Who is the Man) Best Supporting Actress – Diaspora
 Susan Peters – The Entrapped
 Nancy Agyapong – DSK Unauthorized Charmaine Turpin – Bianca Summer Angel – Tears of my Joy Wins Tina Taylor – Scarlet Eefy Ify – The Mechanic (Who is the Man) Best Actor – Diaspora
 Chet Anekwe – Bianca
 Van Vicker – Black Money Pascal Atuma – Secret Past Ramsey Nouah – Exposure John Dumelo – Scarlet Tchidi Chikere – When Heaven Smiles Best Supporting Actor – Diaspora
 Olalekan Akintude – Black Money
 Oscar Atuma – The Mechanic (Who is the Man) Mohamed Bah – Secret Past Koby Maxwell –  Paparazzi: Eye In The Dark Curtis John Miller – Grey Focus Mohamoud Arab - Tears of my Joy Best Film Director – Diaspora
 Robert Peters – Black Money Ab Sallu  –  Secret Past John Uche – Bianca
 Pascal Atuma – The Mechanic (Who is the Man) George Kalu – Faithfulness Bayo Akinfemi – Paparazzi: Eye In The Dark Best Film Producer – Diaspora
 Secret Past – Mohamed Bah, Susan Nwokedi
 'Bianca – John Uche The Entrapped – Wendy Bangura
 The Mechanic (Who is the Man) – Pascal Atuma
 Paparazzi – Clarice Kulah/ Koby Maxwell
 Black Money – Chris Ikpefua

Viewers' Choice Categories
 Best Male Act (Viewer's Choice)
 John Dumelo
 Ramsey Nouah Majid Michel
 Desmond Elliot
 Van Vicker
 Jim Iyke
 Mike Ezuruonye
 Yemi Blaq

 Best Female Act (Viewer's Choice)
 Omotola Jalade
 Mercy Johnson Nadia Buari
 Genevieve Nnaji
 Uche Jombo
 Jackie Appiah
 Tonto Dikeh
 Ini Edo

 Best Film Director (Viewer's Choice)
 Kunle Afolayan
 Frank Rajah-Arase Desmond Elliot
 Pascal Amanfo
 Tunde Kelani
 Teco Benson
 Phil Efe Bernard
 Tom Robson

 Best Male Act – DIASPORA (Viewer's Choice)
 Tchidi Chikere
 Pascal Atuma Chet Anekwe
 Hakeem Kae-Kazim
 Oliver Mbamara

 Best Female Act – DIASPORA (Viewer's Choice)
 Sana Kanu
 JJ Bunny
 Veeda Darko
 Seun Maduka
 Merlisa Determined'''

 Best Male Act (Hollywood – Viewer's Choice)
 Idris Elba
 Samuel L. Jackson
 Denzel Washington
 Kevin Hart
 Will Smith
 Don Cheadle
 Isaiah Washington
 Djimon Hounsou

 Best Female Act (Hollywood – Viewer's Choice)
 Meagan Good
 Kerry Washington
 Lynn Whitfield
 Queen Latifah
 Halle Berry
 Taraji Henson
 Princess Monique
 Sophie Okonedo

Special Categories
 Lifetime Achievement Award
Emem Isong
 Honorarium Humanitarian Award
Amobi Okoye
 Music Achievement Award
J Martins
 Honorarium Appreciation Awards
Van Vicker
Uche Jombo
Ini Edo
Jim Iyke
Kelly Hansome
Pascal Atuma

References

African film awards
2012 film awards